Wang Bingqian (born June 1925) is a politician of the People's Republic of China and a former Minister of Finance of China.

Born in Li County, Hebei, Wang joined the Chinese Communist Party (CCP) in January 1940. 

Wang was a member of the 13th Central Committee of the Chinese Communist Party.

References

1925 births
Living people
People's Republic of China politicians from Hebei
Chinese Communist Party politicians from Hebei
Politicians from Baoding
Ministers of Finance of the People's Republic of China
State councillors of China
Vice Chairpersons of the National People's Congress